Géza Mészöly (18 September 1876 – 4 May 1919) was a Hungarian sports shooter. He competed in four events at the 1912 Summer Olympics. He was killed during the Hungarian Revolution of 1919.

References

External links
 

1876 births
1919 deaths
Hungarian male sport shooters
Olympic shooters of Hungary
Shooters at the 1912 Summer Olympics
Sportspeople from Fejér County
Hungarian military personnel killed in action